Geommasan is a mountain of Gyeongsangbuk-do, eastern South Korea.

See also
List of mountains of Korea

References

Yeongyang County
Mountains of North Gyeongsang Province
Mountains of South Korea
One-thousanders of South Korea